Parhaplothrix is a genus of longhorn beetles of the subfamily Lamiinae, containing the following species:

 Parhaplothrix margaretae Gilmour, 1947
 Parhaplothrix strandi Breuning, 1935
 Parhaplothrix sulphureus Breuning, 1954
 Parhaplothrix szetschuanicus Breuning, 1935

References

Lamiini